Johann Ernst III, Duke of Saxe-Weimar (Weimar, 22 June 1664 – Weimar, 10 May 1707), was a duke of Saxe-Weimar.

Life 
He was the second son of Johann Ernst II, Duke of Saxe-Weimar, and Christine Elisabeth of Schleswig-Holstein-Sonderburg.

After the death of his father in 1683, he inherited the duchy of Saxe-Weimar with his older brother Wilhelm Ernst as co-ruler (Mitherr).

Johann Ernst was an alcoholic; this, and his non-interest in the government, was taken advantage of by his brother, who became the only, autocratic, ruler of the duchy. However, until the time of his death, Johann Ernst served as co-duke, without any significant influence on the government.

Johann Sebastian Bach and Weimar
In the first half of 1703, Johann Sebastian Bach served as a court musician at Weimar. He was still in his teens and developing a reputation as an organist. Little is known of his precise role (he may have been taken on as a violinist rather than a keyboardist), but as a mere musician, he most likely was considered a servant. He left to take up a position as organist of a church at Arnstadt.

Bach returned to Weimar in 1708, after Johann Ernst's death, as court organist. Bach worked with one of Johann Ernst's sons, also called Johann Ernst, who had a keen interest in music. The prince's interest in collecting music was sufficiently well known that in 1713, when one of Bach's pupils, P. D. Kräuter, was requesting leave of absence to study in Weimar, he mentioned the French and Italian music that the prince was expected to introduce there.
The prince also composed, and Bach wrote the Organ Concerto No.1 in G Major, BWV 592, and Concerto for Organ solo in C major, BWV 595, after a theme by the prince.

Family
In Zerbst on 11 October 1685 Johann Ernst married firstly Sophie Auguste of Anhalt-Zerbst. They had five children:

 Johann Wilhelm (b. Weimar, 4 June 1686 - d. Weimar, 14 October 1686).
 Ernst August I, Duke of Saxe-Weimar (b. Weimar, 19 April 1688 - d. Eisenach, 19 January 1748), later inherited Eisenach and Jena.
 Eleonore Christiane (b. Weimar, 15 April 1689 - d. Weimar, 7 February 1690).
 Johanna Auguste (b. Weimar, 6 July 1690 - d. Weimar, 24 August 1691).
 Johanna Charlotte (b. Weimar, 23 November 1693 - d. Weimar, 2 March 1751).

In Kassel on 4 November 1694 and only two months after the death of his first wife, Johann Ernst married secondly Charlotte Dorothea Sophia of Hesse-Homburg. They had four children:
 Karl Friedrich (b. Weimar, 31 October 1695 - d. Weimar, 30 March 1696).
 Johann Ernst (b. Weimar, 25 December 1696 - d. Frankfurt, 1 August 1715), a composer who studied with Bach and of whose concertos Bach made transcriptions .
 Marie Luise (b. Weimar, 18 December 1697 - d. Weimar, 29 December 1704).
 Christiane Sophie (b. Weimar, 7 April 1700 - d. Weimar, 18 February 1701).

After Johann Ernst's death, his successor and eldest son, Ernst August, was nominally given his father's power, but the real power was retained by his uncle, Wilhelm Ernst, until his death in 1728, when Ernst August became the sole reigning duke of Saxe-Weimar.

Ancestors

References

External links
"Organ Concerto No.1 in G Major, BWV 592", Marie-Claire Alain, YouTube

Dukes of Saxe-Weimar
1664 births
1707 deaths